A hermaphrodite is an organism that possesses both male and female reproductive organs during its life.

Hermaphrodite may also refer to:


Biology
Hermaphrodite (botany), an individual plant that has only bisexual reproductive units, or a plant population comprising plants whose flowers have both male and female parts
Bovine hermaphrodite, an infertile female cattle with masculinized behavior and non-functioning ovaries
Sequential hermaphrodite, an individual that changes its sex at some point in its life
Simultaneous hermaphrodite, an individual that has sex organs of both sexes and can produce both gamete types even in the same breeding season
Intersex person, an individual born with any of several variations in sex characteristics including chromosomes, gonads, sex hormones or genitals that do not fit the typical definitions for male or female bodies
Pseudohermaphrodite,  an organism that is born with primary sex characteristics of one sex but develops the secondary sex characteristics that are different from what would be expected on the basis of the gonadal tissue
True hermaphrodite, a medical term for an individual who is born with ovarian and testicular tissue

Creative works
Hermaphrodite (Nadar), a series of photographs of an intersex person taken by 19th-century French photographer Nadar
The Hermaphrodite, a novel by Julia Ward Howe
 Hermaphrodites with Attitude, a journal formerly published by the Intersex Society of North America
Journal of a Sad Hermaphrodite, a book by Michael de Larrabeiti

Other uses
Hermaphrodite brig, a type of sailing ship
Hermaphrodite caliper, a type of caliper used to measure the distance between two opposite sides of an object
Hermaphroditic connector, gender of connectors and fasteners

See also
Hermaphroditus, a god in Greek mythology